Goura is a settlement in Corinthia, Greece. It is located at an altitude of 950 metres on the western slopes of Mount Zireia in the valley of the river Olvios, 91 kilometres south-west of Corinth. The village is named after the hero of the Greek War of Independence, Nikolaos Oikonomou-Gouras. His house, along with those of fellow-fighters Sarlis and Mourtis, still stands.

Populated places in Corinthia